The 106th District of the Texas House of Representatives represents the eastern portion of Denton County. The current Representative of this district is Jared Patterson, a Republican from Frisco who has represented the district since 2019 when Pat Fallon vacated the seat to successfully run for Texas Senate, and later went on to serve in the U.S. Congress.  

This district represents western Frisco, northeastern parts of the city of Denton, all of The Colony, Aubrey, Pilot Point, Krugerville, and Sanger.

The 106th district contains parts of Lake Lewisville and Ray Roberts Lake. It is located wholly inside Texas State Senate district 30, but is split between Texas U.S. Congressional districts 4 and 26. The district borders Texas State House district 66 to its east, 57 to its west, 65 to its south, and both 62 and 68 to the north.

List of representatives

References 

106
Denton County, Texas